In enzymology, a N-acetylmuramoyl-L-alanine amidase is an enzyme that catalyzes a chemical reaction that cleaves the link between N-acetylmuramoyl residues and L-amino acid residues in certain cell-wall glycopeptides.

This enzyme belongs to the family of hydrolases, specifically those acting on carbon-nitrogen bonds other than peptide bonds in linear amides. The systematic name of this enzyme class is peptidoglycan amidohydrolase. Other names in common use include acetylmuramyl-L-alanine amidase, N-acetylmuramyl-L-alanine amidase, N-acylmuramyl-L-alanine amidase, acetylmuramoyl-alanine amidase, N-acetylmuramic acid L-alanine amidase, acetylmuramyl-alanine amidase, N-acetylmuramylalanine amidase, N-acetylmuramoyl-L-alanine amidase type I, and N-acetylmuramoyl-L-alanine amidase type II. This enzyme participates in peptidoglycan biosynthesis. Autolysins and some phage lysins are examples of N-acetylmuramoyl-L-alanine amidases.

See also
 Phage lysins
 Autolysins
 PGLYRP2

References

 
  
 
 

EC 3.5.1
Enzymes of known structure